Prism is the fourth studio album by American singer Katy Perry. It was released by Capitol Records on October 18, 2013. While the album was initially planned to be "darker" than her previous material, Prism ultimately became a prominently dance-inspired record. Perry worked with several past collaborators, while enlisting new producers and guest vocals. Much of Prism revolves around the themes of living in the present, relationships, and self-empowerment. The album garnered generally positive reviews with critics praising its lyrics for being more "mature" and personal, while others considered Prism to be more formulaic than her previous material.

The album debuted atop the US Billboard 200 with 286,000 copies sold, becoming Perry's best opening week to date. The album also peaked at number one in Australia, Canada, Ireland, New Zealand, and the United Kingdom. Prism became Perry's fastest-selling album, the second best-selling album in Australia in 2013, and the second best-selling album released by a woman in the United States in 2013. The International Federation of the Phonographic Industry (IFPI) reported that Prism was the sixth best-selling album in the world in 2013, the best-selling album in the world in 2013 released by a woman, and labeled Perry "a global phenomenon." It has sold over 4 million copies worldwide. The album's success continued throughout 2014, ranking within the top 10 of the annual charts for 2014 in the United States, Canada, Australia, and New Zealand, and earned Perry a Grammy Award nomination for Best Pop Vocal Album at the 57th Annual Grammy Awards.

The release of the album was preceded by the release of two singles. "Roar" was released on August 10, 2013, as the album's lead single and topped the Billboard Hot 100. "Unconditionally" debuted on October 16, 2013, as the record's second single. In between the release of these two tracks were the releases of promotional singles "Dark Horse" on September 17 and "Walking on Air" on September 30, 2013. "Dark Horse" was released as the album's third single three months later on December 17, 2013, and also reached number one on the Billboard Hot 100. "Birthday" and "This Is How We Do" were the fourth and fifth singles, respectively. Prism was further promoted through the Prismatic World Tour.

Background

After concluding her California Dreams Tour, Perry stated that she intended to "live a little" before recording any new material that was "worth listening to". When ex-husband Russell Brand left her on December 30, 2011, she felt devastated and contemplated suicide. Perry revealed to Vogue in June 2012 that she planned to record a "darker" album than her previous records. She stated: "It was inevitable, after what I went through. If I had a time machine and could go back in time, I would. But I can't, so, you'll discover another part of me." To Interview, she mentioned that she aspired to include a more acoustic vibe to the record.

Perry also said that her music would be getting "real fucking dark" and "shoegazing", though also stated that her fans would be able to relate to it. "I imagine that maybe my next record would be a little bit more of an artistic venture," she said. "Not that I'm going to self-sabotage either and be like, 'I'm going to make a crazy record that nobody really understands.'" That fall, she later told Billboard about her plans for the album, saying she already envisioned several aspects of it. Perry told the magazine that she already had songs and ideas, and knew the type of record she would make next. She also said that although she had not started recording yet, she already knew how the artwork, coloring and tone of the album would turn out. Perry further detailed: "I have to let the music take shape first. I even know what type of tour I'm doing next. I'll be very pleased if the vision I have in my head becomes a reality. But I have to honor the music."

Recording
The development of Prism started when Perry was embarking on the California Dreams Tour. She began with a process she deemed "slow cooking", which consisted of recording random "fragments of ideas" into her mobile phone's dictaphone application. A member of Direct Management Group, Ngoc Hoang, then transcribed the audio files, which he inserted into what Perry described as a "treasure chest"; such object was consulted by Perry later on during the album's recording sessions. While Perry started recording the album officially in November 2012, accompanied by Greg Wells and Greg Kurstin, she noted she was still in a "dark place", and that she had not "let the light in". The sessions began again in March 2013, following a trip to Madagascar which Perry credited as having "put [her] priorities in perspective", thus leading her to "do more work on [her]self". Perry also viewed a video made by Eckhart Tolle, which discusses loss. She commented: "When you lose something, all your foundations crumble—but that also leaves a big hole that's open for something great to come through."

After feeling prepared to record again, she reunited with her team from Teenage Dream—Dr. Luke, Bonnie McKee, and Cirkut—in Perry's hometown of Santa Barbara, California, where they spent a month recording at Playback Recording Studio among others. After those sessions, she went to Stockholm, where she worked with Scandinavian record producer Max Martin, to do what Perry called "put[ting] the ice on the cake". She also recruited other collaborators, such as Norwegian team Stargate, Bloodshy, Benny Blanco, Jonatha Brooke and Sia. By April 2013, recording for the album was halfway complete, and Perry revealed to ASCAP how was working with such collaborators. She affirmed that Wells allowed her to "vomit words"; with Martin, she picked the melodies of the songs; Luke mostly helmed the production and she worked with "topline and melody". Perry described writing sessions with McKee as "emotional abuse", adding that they argue over the "best lyric", as if they were fighting in a boxing ring. McKee, who wrote four songs for Prism, spoke with MTV on the effort, describing it as "a little bit more grown up" and "interesting".

Composition

The album opens with "Roar", a midtempo synth-driven power pop track. Musically, it contains elements of arena rock and glam rock, while lyrically it is an empowerment anthem. Comparisons were established between "Roar" and "Brave" by Sara Bareilles. "Legendary Lovers", a bhangra-based song, deals with the concepts of karma and infinity. "Birthday" was described by Perry as her own attempt at "writing something Mariah Carey would have put on her first record". Musically, it is a "fluffy" pop song that is primarily styled in the genre of disco. "Walking on Air", the album's second promotional single, is an early 1990s-inspired deep house-Eurodance-disco song, inspired heavily by CeCe Peniston and Crystal Waters. It was produced by Klas Åhlund and Max Martin. "Unconditionally", Perry's personal favorite song on the album and second official single, is a "soaring" power ballad with an "epic chorus". Jason Lipshutz from Billboard noted that the song includes a "woodblock percussion" as well as "a dramatic bass line" and deemed it the album's "most mature offering". Furthermore, he called it "an ode to love that looks past all flaws" and stated that the song acts as a "compellingly grounded predicate" to the title track from Teenage Dream. Perry herself described the song as a song about unconditional love that could come in all forms, including those from relationships, from parent-to-child, and from sibling-to-sibling.

"Dark Horse" is a song with ample influences of trap, grime, hip hop, and "Southern rap-techno mashup" genres. "This Is How We Do", produced by Max Martin and Klas Ahlund, was described as being the possible "song of summer" for 2014. Shirley Halperin from The Hollywood Reporter described "This Is How We Do" as "a sunny 80s throwback", while Edna Gundersen from USA Today described it as a "buoyant pop blast with hip-hop underpinnings" and praised the song's recurring refrain ("It's no big deal!"). James Montgomery from MTV News called the song a "cocksure, club-ready banger". With "Double Rainbow", produced by Greg Kustin and co-writer Sia, Perry was allowed to "dump pent-up emotions" and "get things off her chest". The song was described as a "massive ballad". Lipshutz deemed it as a "breathy love track" with a "powerful chorus that explodes upon impact" with lyrics that include "One man's trash is another man's treasure / so if it's up to me, I'm gonna keep you forever". He added that "Kurstin brings the pop sensibility he's flashed with artists like Kelly Clarkson and P!nk, while Sia's presence connects this sleek, shimmering pop track to [her David Guetta collaboration] 'Titanium'". Elijah Sarkesian felt that "Some of Katy's finest vocals of the album are on this song".

Perry described "Love Me" as a song "about loving yourself the way you want to be loved". Gundersen called it "irresistibly catchy and energetic". The song was produced by Bloodshy. Sarkesian called it "an interesting mix – the lyrics are dark, but the music is very dance-centric. At the very least, it'll do well in clubs". Montgomery stated that "Love Me" and "International Smile" both "seem destined for the dance floors". The latter was inspired by Perry's friend Mia Moretti, and was compared to the songs on Perry's previous album. Lipshutz called it a "straightforward pop-rock offering" and described its guitar hook as "kicky", adding that the song also includes a "Melting Daft Punk-esque vocoder breakdown". Halperin stated that in the song, Perry sings the "hooky" line: "Please fasten your seat belts and make sure your champagne glasses are empty".

Halperin described "This Moment" and "Ghost" as "mid-tempo ballads that are closest in DNA to Perry's previous smashes". Perry stated that she was inspired to write "This Moment" after she heard the audio book of The Power of Now; the song's lyrics talk about "living in the present"; with Perry "add[ing] a romantic spin" to it. Gary Trust described "Ghost" as a "mesmerizing ballad", while Gundersen described it as "powerful, dark, and haunting". Lipshutz felt that "Ghost" and "By the Grace of God" contain the album's "most somber moments". While talking about each Prism track, Perry mentioned that "By the Grace of God" was the first song she wrote and recorded for the album back in November 2012 while she was in her "dark" phase. Jody Rosen from Vulture described bonus track "Spiritual" as an inspirational song. Kevin Fallon of The Daily Beast described "It Takes Two" as a "sweeping ballad" which allowed Perry to "show off a full-throated belt that so many of her more bubbly tracks mask". In "Choose Your Battles", Perry "pounds her chest and spews venom at the man she cannot understand".

Release and promotion

Promotion and countdown singles 

On July 29, 2013, a golden truck driving in Los Angeles revealed the album's title as Prism and that it would be released on October 22, 2013. On August 9, the truck was hit by a drunk driver in Pennsylvania, but no injuries were reported. On August 20, Pepsi revealed a partnership with Perry, in which fans were given the opportunity to unlock song titles, lyrics, and snippets from Prism by tweeting the hashtag #KATYNOW. Additionally, Pepsi provided previews of the songs "Dark Horse" and "Walking on Air", and fans could vote for which song they wanted to have an early release on music platforms. The former song was declared the winner and was released onto iTunes on September 17, 2013.

Three listening parties for Prism were hosted: on September 5, 2013, one was hosted in New York, open exclusively to an audience of 100 industry insiders and journalists, where twelve tracks were played. A second Prism listening party took place the next day in Atlanta, while a third took place September 12 in Los Angeles at the Hammer Museum. In a press release on August 20, 2013, Pepsi announced a partnership with Perry to promote her fourth studio album Prism: a social "tweet-to-unlock" voting program, encouraging fans to tweet the hashtag #KATYNOW in exchange for song titles and lyrics. The chosen tracks for the campaign were "Walking on Air" and "Dark Horse". After the samples were revealed, fans could vote for which one they wanted to have an early release on digital retailers.

The winner was "Dark Horse", which was released on September 17, 2013, on the iTunes Store, serving then as the album's first promotional single. It debuted at number 17 on the US Billboard Hot 100, and at number ten on the New Zealand Singles Chart. Perry first performed "Dark Horse" three days later at the iHeartRadio Music Festival. "Walking on Air" was released as the second promotional single on September 30. The song peaked at number 34 at Billboard Hot 100 and at number 80 in the United Kingdom.

Prism was released on October 18, 2013. Its album cover was unveiled on September 6, 2013, on a Jumbotron during Good Morning America, and was shot by American photographer Ryan McGinley. For the deluxe edition, 300,000 copies with an iridescent digipak package were printed, and came with the album's logo printed onto seed paper.

Prismatic World Tour 

Perry began the Prismatic World Tour on May 7, 2014, at the Odyssey Arena in Belfast, Northern Ireland. The first leg of the tour also featured performances in Scotland and England that month. The second leg was announced on January 15, 2014, consisting of concerts in Canada, Mexico, and the United States. The leg ran from June to October 2014.

Singles
"Roar" was serviced to mainstream radio stations on August 10, 2013, as the album's lead single, and its digital release followed two days later. It received mixed-to-positive commentary from music critics, who commended its "easy" and "poppy" beat, while some were ambivalent towards its clichéd lyrics. Commercially, it was a success, topping the Billboard Hot 100 and charts in Australia, Canada, New Zealand, and the United Kingdom. It became Australia's best performing song of 2013 with 560,000 copies sold by the end of the year and spending 9 weeks atop the nation's charts. The song was nominated for the Song of the Year and the Best Pop Solo Performance awards at the 56th Annual Grammy Awards.

"Unconditionally" was released as the album's second single on October 16, 2013. It received generally favorable reviews from critics, who praised it for being "soaring" and "effortless". A lyric video for the song was released two days after its debut, and its official music video was released on November 19, 2013. To promote the single, Perry has performed on various occasions, including a geisha-themed performance of it on the American Music Awards of 2013, which attracted negative press, controversy and accusations of cultural appropriation. "Unconditionally" has peaked at number 14 on the Billboard Hot 100 and has charted moderately worldwide, reaching the top 30 in the single charts of Canada and Germany  and the Top 10 in Italy.

"Dark Horse" was released on December 17, 2013, as the album's third official single. It had previously been released as the album's first promotional single exactly three months prior to its single release. The following week, the song leaped to number four due to topping the Hot Digital Songs, selling 243,000 copies. With "Dark Horse" topping the Hot Digital Songs chart, it became Perry's 10th digital number-one single. The song topped the Billboard Hot 100 chart on January 29, 2014, becoming Perry's 9th number one single in the United States. It was nominated for Best Pop Duo/Group Performance at the 57th Annual Grammy Awards.

On April 3, 2014, "Birthday" was announced as the album's fourth official single. It debuted at number 91 on the Billboard Hot 100 and impacted mainstream radio in the U.S. on April 21, 2014. This single peaked at number 17 in the US, becoming her 15th song to reach the top 20 in the nation.

"This Is How We Do" served as the fifth official single from the album. A lyric video of the song was released on July 24, 2014. One week later, its official music video premiered and the track was sent to French radio on the same day. The song debuted at number 88 on the Billboard Hot 100 on August 9, 2014, and peaked at number 24.

According to PopDust and Charts in France, "Legendary Lovers" was set to be released as a single, however its release was cancelled to unknown reasons. However, the song received unofficial airplay in France. Additionally track's producer Max Martin hinted possible remix release featuring Canadian rapper and singer Drake.

Critical reception 

Upon release, Prism received generally favorable reviews from music critics. Jon Dolan from Rolling Stone gave the album three out of five stars, writing that "Perry and her longtime collaborators Dr. Luke and Max Martin often go for a darker, moodier intimacy à la high-end Swedish divas Robyn and Lykke Li. Perry has always done a great job of letting us know she's in on the joke of pop stardom. Sadly, she doesn't always bring that same sense of humor and self-awareness to the joke of pop-star introspection. The album's raft of ripe-lotus ballads is larded with Alanis-ian poesy she can't pull off". Nick Catucci from Entertainment Weekly gave the album a B+ and stated that "Katy's superpower, now more than ever, is minting songs so relatable that their insights quickly scale up to inspirational..... Now she grasps that she's making the mainstream, not just swimming in it".

Helen Brown from The Daily Telegraph gave the album five out of five stars, stating Perry "sounds like a woman, and an artist, who's finally found herself" and praised the "vulnerability" of the album. Stephen Thomas Erlewine from AllMusic, Alexis Petridis from The Guardian, and Sal Cinquemani from Slant Magazine all also gave the album three out of five stars. Erlewine dubbed Prism "a tighter, cleaner record than its predecessors". Petridis called it "Katy Perry's most spiritual album to date". Mesfin Fekadu from ABC News deemed the tracks "likable", but felt the album lacked "some of the fiery fierceness and excitement that dominated Teenage Dream". James Reed from The Boston Globe felt Perry "always seemed like the pop star who knows precisely what she does best" and called the album "an unabashedly fun listen". Chris Bosman from Consequence of Sound gave the album three and a half out of five stars, calling Perry "a champion of choruses". Greg Kot from Chicago Tribune gave the album 2 out of 4 stars, commenting "Though not exactly spiritual, Prism does come off as a more serious—if no less formulaic—album than its predecessor". Marah Eakin from The A.V. Club gave the album a C+, commenting "A lot of Prism is simply forgettable", though praised the tracks "Roar", "Birthday", and "This Is How We Do". Rob Harvilla from Spin gave the album a 5/10 rating, and felt some of the material was not "all that desirable".

Elysa Gardner from USA Today gave the album a 3/4 rating and found the album to be "genuine and endearing". Trent Wolbe from The Verge gave an overall 4/4 rating and praised Perry's ability to "wrapping hyper-specific emotions into a new format that everyone can relate to". He particularly praised the tracks "International Smile" and "Birthday", declaring the chorus of "Birthday" to be "fucking perfect". Jody Rosen from Vulture was disappointed with every track on the album except for "Roar". Randall Roberts of Los Angeles Times gave the album a 3/4 rating, calling it "a shimmering, dynamic, heavy-duty modern pop album". At the 57th Annual Grammy Awards, Prism was nominated for Best Pop Vocal Album, but lost against Sam Smith's In the Lonely Hour.

Commercial performance

Prism made its official debut in Ireland, where it charted atop the charts. In the United States, the album opened at the top spot on the US Billboard 200, becoming her second consecutive number one album in the country. The album sold 286,000 copies in its first week. Prism acquired the largest first week sum by a female artist for 2013, surpassing Miley Cyrus' Bangerz (270,000 copies). However, this feat was surpassed by Beyoncé's self-titled fifth album, Beyoncé (617,213 digital copies), released in December 2013. At the time of its release Prism had the fourth highest first week sales of the year for a pop record, trailing behind Daft Punk's May 2013 album Random Access Memories, which sold 339,000 copies and Justin Timberlake's The 20/20 Experience which debuted to 968,000 copies and its follow-up The 20/20 Experience – 2 of 2 which debuted to just 350,000 copies. The first week sales also marks Perry's highest weekly sales, with her previous album Teenage Dream selling 192,000 copies in its first week in August 2010. Prism has the highest first week sales for a female pop artist since Madonna's twelfth studio album, MDNA. Prism sold 92,000 copies during its second week of availability, falling to number two on the Billboard 200. This represented the smallest sales dip for a number one album in the United States since the August 2013 release of The Civil Wars. Prism spent 17 weeks in the top-ten on the chart. The album has been certified quintuple platinum by the Recording Industry Association of America (RIAA), and has sold 1.74 million copies in the United States as of August 2020. In June 2014, Billboard announced its Mid Year Top 20 Best-selling albums with Prism coming in at number 9 with sales of 453,000 in 2014 alone. Pharrell Williams and Perry were the only two people in to have an album and a single in the Mid Year Top 10 charts. In February 2015, following Perry's performance at the Super Bowl XLIX halftime show, sales for the album increased by 85% and the album rebounded back into the Top 50.

In New Zealand, the album became Perry's second consecutive number one album, and was certified gold by Recorded Music NZ, selling over 7,500 copies in its first week sales. Prism opened atop the ARIA Album Charts, giving the singer her second number-one album in Australia after Teenage Dream. It was the nation's 688th album to top its charts overall and 342nd to enter at the summit. The record received a Platinum certification from the Australian Recording Industry Association (ARIA) during its second week of release, and became the country's second highest-selling album of the year behind Pink's The Truth About Love with 179,000 copies sold by the end of 2013.

In Europe, the album was a moderate success. In Switzerland, the album debuted at two, just behind James Blunt's Moon Landing and was certified Gold shortly after. In Austria, the album debuted at number three and was certified Gold in its first week, achieving Platinum certification a month later. In France, Prism debuted in the Top 10, spending a dozen weeks in the Top 40, and has sold over 130,000 copies according to SNEP. In the United Kingdom, it peaked at the top of the charts, where it was certified Platinum and went on to sell 433,000 copies by February 2017. In The Netherlands and Denmark, the album debuted and peaked at number four. As of August 2015, Prism has sold over 4 million copies worldwide.

Accolades

Track listing
Credits adapted from the liner notes of Prism.

Personnel
The following people contributed to Prism:

 Klas Åhlund – production, programming
 Cory Bice – assistant
 Tim Blacksmith – management
 Ron Blake – saxophone
 Benny Blanco – instrumentation, production, programming
 Delbert Bowers – assistant
 Peter Carlsson – engineer
 Cirkut – instrumentation, production, programming
 Bradford Cobb – management
 Danny D. – management
 Sabina Ddumba – background vocals
 Dr. Luke – coral sitar, executive producer, instrumentation, production, programming
 Eric Eylands – assistant
 Rachael Findlen – assistant
 Justin Fox – assistant recording engineer
 Alex Foster – saxophone
 Mike Foster – engineer
 Chris Galland – assistant
 Earl Gardner – trumpet
 Chris Gehringer – mastering
 Şerban Ghenea – mixing
 Clint Gibbs – engineer
 John Hanes – engineer
 Ngoc Hoàng – management
 Sam Holland – engineer
 Ian Mcgregor – engineer
 Michael Ilbert – engineer
 Ava James – vocals
 Steven Jensen – management
 Juicy J – featured artist, vocals
 Aditya Kalyanpur – tabla
 Christian Karlsson – engineer, instrumentation, production, programming
 Martin Kirkup – management
 Greg Kurstin – engineer, guitar, keyboards, production, programming
 Ronobit Lahiri – sitar
 Tucker Bodine – engineer
 Andrew Luftman – production co-ordination
 Magnus – engineer, instrumentation, programming
 Manny Marroquin – mixing
 Max Martin – executive producer, instrumentation, production, programming, background vocals
 John Mayer – guitar
 Dan McCarroll – A&R
 Ryan McGinley – photography
 Mogollon – art direction, design
 Dave O'Donnell – horn engineer
 Alex Pasco – engineer
 Katy Perry – executive producer, primary artist, production, lead vocals, background vocals
 Lenny Pickett – horn arrangements, saxophone
 Vincent Pontare – engineer, instrumentation, programming
 Irene Richter – production co-ordination
 Saturday Night Live Band – main personnel
 Chris Sclafani – assistant
 Gingger Shankar – double violin
 Jesse Shatkin – engineer
 Stargate – instrumentation, production, programming, composition, engineering
 Tensta Gospel Choir – background vocals
 Steve Turre – trombone
 Greg Wells – drums, piano, production, programming, synthesizer
 Steven Wolf – drums
 Scott "Yarmov" Yarmovsky – production co-ordination
 Kenta Yonesaka – assistant

Charts

Weekly charts

Year-end charts

Decade-end charts

Certifications and sales

See also 
 Album era

References

2013 albums
Capitol Records albums
Katy Perry albums
Albums produced by Klas Åhlund
Albums produced by Dr. Luke
Albums produced by Max Martin
Albums produced by Benny Blanco
Albums produced by Bloodshy & Avant
Albums produced by Cirkut
Albums produced by Greg Kurstin
Albums produced by Greg Wells
Albums produced by Stargate
Albums involved in plagiarism controversies